Marek Kawa (born 22 July 1975 in Opole) is a Polish politician. He was elected to the Sejm on 25 September 2005, getting 6346 votes in 21 Opole district as a candidate from the League of Polish Families list.

See also
Members of Polish Sejm 2005-2007

External links
Marek Kawa - parliamentary page - includes declarations of interest, voting record, and transcripts of speeches.

1975 births
Living people
People from Opole
Members of the Polish Sejm 2005–2007
League of Polish Families politicians